Vyrubov is a Russian masculine surname (feminine: Vyrubova). It originated from vyrub, a space in a forest cleared from trees, which used to be a common dwelling place in the past. The surname may refer to
Anna Vyrubova (1884–1964), best friend and confidante of Russian Tsaritsa Alexandra Fyodorovna
Grigory Vyrubov (1843–1913), Russian philosopher and historian of science

References

Russian-language surnames